Good Bones is an American reality television series airing on HGTV starring Karen E Laine and Mina Starsiak Hawk, based in Indianapolis, Indiana.

Episodes

Series overview

Season 1 (2016)

Season 2 (2017)

Season 3 (2018)

Season 4 (2019)

Season 5 (2020)

Season 6 (2021)

Season 7 (2022)

References

External links
 Episode Guide

Good Bones